Wendover Airport  is a county-owned, public-use airport located one nautical mile (2 km) southeast of the central business district of Wendover, a city on the western edge of Tooele County, Utah, United States, near the border with Nevada.

Description
The airport is included in the National Plan of Integrated Airport Systems for 2011–2015, which categorized it as a primary commercial service airport. As per Federal Aviation Administration records, the airport had 46,264 passenger boardings (enplanements) in calendar year 2008, 50,360 enplanements in 2009, and 50,734 in 2010.

History

Military

The Wendover Airport is located at the site of the former Wendover Air Force Base, which ceased most military operations in the mid-1960s.

Civilian
Wendover AAF was declared surplus in 1976 and on June 16 most of the field, including the water system, was turned over to Wendover, Utah, as a municipal airport.  Beginning in 1980, the 4440th Tactical Fighter Training Group (Red Flag) at Nellis AFB, Nevada, used the field for exercises, but they were discontinued after 1986. In the late 1990s the airport's ownership was transferred from the city of Wendover to Tooele County.

Still-extant facilities include three paved runways, numerous ramps, taxiways, dispersal pads, all of the original hangars (including the "Enola Gay" B-29 hangar), and 75 other World War II–era buildings.

Several flying scenes for the 1997 movie Con Air were filmed at Wendover, using a Fairchild C-123K Provider.  A non-profit group, Historic Wendover Airfield, is attempting to restore the historic elements of the field.

Facilities and aircraft
Wendover Airport covers an area of 1,960 acres (793 ha) at an elevation of 4,237 feet (1,291 m) above mean sea level. It has two runways with asphalt surfaces: 8/26 is 10,002 by 150 feet (3,048.61 x 46 m) and 12/30 is 8,002 by 100 feet (2,439 x 30 m).

For the 12-month period ending December 31, 2011, the airport had 5,009 aircraft operations, an average of 13 per day: 73% general aviation, 15% scheduled commercial, and 12% military. At that time there were 7 aircraft based at this airport: 57% jet and 43% single-engine. The airport is an uncontrolled airport that has no control tower.

Airlines and destinations

As of February 2022, there are no scheduled airline service to Wendover. However, Swift Air offers charter flights to various cities across the United States and Canada from Wendover using Boeing 737-800 and Boeing 737-400 aircraft, as part of a package deal to bring tourists to local casinos. On average, the airport sees one charter flight per day.

See also

 List of airports in Utah
 National Register of Historic Places listings in Tooele County, Utah

References

External links

 Historic Wendover Airfield
 Aerial image as of September 1993 from USGS The National Map
 
 
 

Airports in Utah
Buildings and structures in Tooele County, Utah
Government buildings on the National Register of Historic Places in Utah
Transportation buildings and structures on the National Register of Historic Places in Utah
Airports on the National Register of Historic Places
Transportation in Tooele County, Utah
National Register of Historic Places in Tooele County, Utah